The 2021 Henderson Tennis Open was a professional women's tennis tournament played on outdoor hard courts. It was the twelfth edition of the tournament which was part of the 2021 ITF Women's World Tennis Tour. It took place in Henderson, Las Vegas, United States between 4 and 10 October 2021.

Singles main-draw entrants

Seeds

 1 Rankings are as of 27 September 2021.

Other entrants
The following players received wildcards into the singles main draw:
  Haley Giavara
  Rasheeda McAdoo 
  Shatoo Mohamad
  Alexandra Riley

The following players received entry using protected rankings:
  Louisa Chirico
  Hiroko Kuwata

The following players received entry from the qualifying draw:
  Shir Azran
  Ibifuro Clement
  Molly Helgesson
  Tricia Mar
  Rhiann Newborn
  Erica Oosterhout 
  Holly Verner
  Marcela Zacarías

Champions

Singles

  Emina Bektas def.  Yuriko Lily Miyazaki, 6–1, 6–1

Doubles

  Quinn Gleason /  Tereza Mihalíková def.  Emina Bektas /  Tara Moore, 7–6(7–5), 7–5

References

External links
 2021 Henderson Tennis Open at ITFtennis.com
 Official website

2021 ITF Women's World Tennis Tour
2021 in American tennis
October 2021 sports events in the United States
2021 in sports in Nevada